The Oran Park-Gregory Hills Chargers Rugby League Club is a rugby league team based in Oran Park, New South Wales, Australia.

The Chargers play in the Group 6 Rugby League competition. In the 2017 season they have teams playing in the Group 6 Second Division Cup Competition, Ladies League Tag Competition as well as a junior side.

History

2014–2016

2017
Oran Park had a team registered to play in both the Group 6 CRL Cup competition as well as the Group 6 CRL Shield competition.
The Shield side came runners up in the Group 6 CRL Shield competition going down 36-6 to the Bundanoon Highlanders.

2018
Oran Park signed on major sponsor Waratah Landscape Supplies for the start of the 2018 season.

Notable  juniors

See also

Rugby league in New South Wales

References

External links
Oran Park Chargers Fox Sports pulse

Rugby league teams in Sydney
Rugby clubs established in 2014
2014 establishments in Australia
Oran Park, New South Wales